Starmobile is a Filipino smartphone and tablet manufacturer based in Pasig, Philippines. It was established by Star Telecom Alliance Resources, Inc. In 2011, the company entered the mobile sector in the Philippines under the presidency of Michael Chen.

Promotions and endorsements
A massive media event on May 29, 2013 Wednesday afternoon at SM North Edsa was held to launch their concept store. Starmobile took the wraps off their newest flagship smartphone, the Starmobile KNIGHT. The event featured their endorser, Vice Ganda as they also announced their new offerings bannered by their quad-core smartphones.

See also
 List of mobile phone makers by country

References

External links
 

Mobile phone manufacturers
Manufacturing companies of the Philippines
Telecommunications companies of the Philippines
Companies based in Pasig
Philippine brands